This is a list of British television related events from 1973.

Events

January
4 January – The world record-breaking long-running comedy series Last of the Summer Wine starts as a 30-minute pilot on BBC1's Comedy Playhouse show. The first series run starts on 12 November and the programme runs for 37 years until August 2010.
6 January – Sesame Street, goes to air on UTV, the first time the series is transmitted on television in Northern Ireland.
9 January – BBC1 broadcasts the sitcom Whatever Happened to the Likely Lads? starring James Bolam and Rodney Bewes.
11 January – The Open University awards its first degrees.

February
5 February – Elisabeth Beresford's children's characters The Wombles are adapted into a stop motion animated television series which begins airing on BBC1. The series is narrated by Bernard Cribbins with music composed by Mike Batt .
15 February – The first episode of the sitcom Some Mothers Do 'Ave 'Em, starring Michael Crawford as the bumbling Frank Spencer, airs on BBC1.

March
14 March – Are You Being Served? begins its first regular series, six months after the pilot episode had been broadcast as part of the Comedy Playhouse series.
25 March – The pilot episode of Open All Hours airs as part of Ronnie Barker's series Seven of One on BBC1.
March – Experimental Ceefax teletext transmissions begin.

April
1 April – Ronnie Barker stars in Prisoner and Escort, the pilot episode of Porridge, airs as part of Seven of One on BBC1.
30 April – Children's science fiction drama The Tomorrow People is shown for the first time on ITV.

May
5 May–28 July – BBC2 begins screening The Ascent of Man. It is written and presented by Jacob Bronowski and is accompanied by a bestselling book.
May – Sesame Street airs on Westward Television for the first time, originally on Sundays until next Summer when it will be shown on Saturdays.
20 May – BBC2 air the first episode of the US Korean War comedy series M*A*S*H, based on the 1970 movie and starring Alan Alda.
26 May – The magazine show That's Life! makes its debut on BBC1, presented by Esther Rantzen.

June
13 June – The long-running children's sports themed game show We Are the Champions begins on BBC1.

July
13 July – BBC1 show Jack the Ripper, a 6-part spin-off crime series featuring the fictional BBC Detectives Charlie Barlow (Stratford Johns) and John Watt (Frank Windsor), first seen in Z-Cars.  The drama sees the pair investigating the real historic casefiles of Jack the Ripper.

August
6 August – James Beck, who stars as Private Walker in the BBC sitcom Dad's Army, dies of a burst pancreas at the age of 44. Although the series continues until 1977, the part of Walker is not recast and the show carries on without him.
15 August – The first episode of the flat sharing sitcom Man About the House is shown on ITV.  Starring Richard O'Sullivan, its success led to two spin-off ITV sitcoms: George and Mildred and Robin's Nest as well as a 1974 British feature film. 
17 August – ITV airs the feature length pilot episode of the US martial arts western series Kung Fu, starring David Carradine.
20 August – Children's magazine style series Why Don't You? airs for the first time during the 1973 school holidays on BBC1.
24 August – Trade test colour films are shown on BBC2 for the final time.

September
10 September – The Goodies makes its debut in Zambia on ZBS.
 26 September - Scottish and Grampian show live Coverage of a Scotland home international for the first time when they broadcast the World Cup Qualifier between Scotland and Czechoslovakia.

October
 8 October – Pat Phoenix leaves the role of Elsie Tanner on Coronation Street after thirteen years although she'll make a return to the soap on 5 April 1976. 
 17 October – ITV shows a home England international live from Wembley for the first time when it broadcasts the World Cup Qualifier between England v Poland.
31 October 
Thames Television's acclaimed World War II documentary The World at War begins on ITV.  Narrated by Laurence Olivier and shown in 26-parts, the series would go on to be widely regarded as a landmark in British broadcasting.
The sixth series of the BBC sitcom Dad's Army opens with the episode The Deadly Attachment containing the "Don't tell him, Pike!" exchange which becomes rated as one of the top three greatest comedy moments of British television.

November
12 November – First series run of Last of the Summer Wine starts on BBC1.
14 November – The BBC and ITV broadcast extensive live coverage of the Wedding of Princess Anne and Mark Phillips.
19 November – ITV begin showing the Michael Douglas-starring US police series The Streets of San Francisco.
23 November – 10th anniversary of the first episode of Doctor Who.
Smash Martians advertising campaign launches on ITV.

December
 17 December – The government announces severe measures to reduce electricity consumption due to the ongoing overtime ban by the National Union of Mineworkers, strike action in the electricity supply industry and effects of the 1973 oil crisis. Part of these measures are that both BBC and ITV television are ordered to end their broadcasting day earlier than usual, at around 10:30pm in order to save energy. The early closedowns commence that day and continue until Sunday 23 December. They are then lifted so that Christmas and New Year programming can air as normal and provide some light relief to the public. The restrictions will be reimposed from Monday 7 January 1974 and remain for a further month.

Unknown
Three of the five experimental community cable television channels, authorised the previous year by The UK's Minister for Posts and Telecommunications launch. They are Sheffield Cablevision, The Bristol Channel and Swindon Viewpoint. They join Greenwich Cablevision which had launched the previous year. The fifth, Wellingborough Cablevision, begins broadcasting in February 1974.
A Hovis bread advert featuring a baker's delivery boy with a bicycle on Gold Hill, Shaftesbury, Dorset, directed by Ridley Scott, is launched on ITV.

Debuts

BBC1
5 January – Teddy Edward (1973)
7 January – Fish (1973)
9 January – Whatever Happened to the Likely Lads? (1973–1974)
15 January – Alice Through The Looking Glass (1973)
25 January – Whoops Baghdad (1973)
5 February – The Wombles (1973–1975, 1990–1991, 1997–2000)
13 February – The Viaduct (1973)
15 February – Some Mothers Do 'Ave 'Em (1973–1978)
18 February – A Little Princess (1973)
26 February – The Crocodile (1973)
13 March – Lizzie Dripping (1973–1975)
4 April – Barnaby (1973)
25 April – The Gordon Peters Show (1973)
11 May – Scotch on the Rocks (1973)
26 May – That's Life! (1973–1994)
6 June – Son of the Bride (1973)
7 June – Warship (1973–1977)
13 June – We Are the Champions (1973–1995)
16 June – Sutherland's Law (1973–1976)
13 July – Jack the Ripper (1973)
19 July – Centre Play (1973–1978)
20 August – Why Don't You? (1973–1995)
1 September – Moonbase 3 (1973)
12 September – Oh, Father! (1973)
13 September – Casanova '73 (1973)
14 September – The Donati Conspiracy (1973)
27 September – Jane Eyre (1973)
7 October – Pollyanna (1973)
12 November 
 Heil Caesar! (1973)
 The Terracotta Horse (1973)
 Last of the Summer Wine (1973–2010)

BBC2
16 January – Look and Read: Joe and the Sheep Rustlers (1973)
15 February – Weir of Hermiston (1973)
4 March – The Pearcross Girls (1973)
25 March – Seven of One (1973)
1 April – Away from It All (1973)
19 April – Cheri (1973)
1 May – A Picture of Katherine Mansfield (1973)
5 May — The Ascent of Man (1973)
20 May – M*A*S*H (1972–1983)
24 May – The Song of Songs (1973)
28 June – Two Women (1973)
26 July – A Pin to See the Peepshow (1973)
14 August – Black and Blue (1973)
6 September – Then and Now (1973)
23 September – The Dragon's Opponent (1973)
15 October – Second City Firsts (1973–1978)
8 December – Vienna 1900 (1973–1974)
14 December – Frost's Weekly (1973–1974)
27 December – The Vera Lynn Show (1973–1975)

ITV
1 January – Pipkins (1973–1981)
17 January – Whose's Baby? (1973; 1977; 1982–1988)
14 February – All Our Saturdays (1973)
3 February – No Man's Land (1973)
25 February – The Upper Crusts (1973)
28 February – The Jensen Code (1973)
12 March – Hickory House (1973–1977)
13 March – So It Goes (1973)
8 April – Our Kid (1973)
11 April – Armchair 30 (1973)
14 April – Thriller (1973–1976)
30 April – The Tomorrow People (1973–1979, 1992–1995)
2 May – Dolly (1973)
11 May – Between the Wars (1973)
15 May – Hey Brian! (1973)
30 May – The Kids from 47A (1973–1974)
4 June – Hunter's Walk (1973–1976)
12 June – Sam (1973–1975)
26 June – Nobody Is Norman Wisdom (1973)
11 July – Shabby Tiger (1973)
13 July – Sir Yellow (1973)
29 July – Bowler (1973)
12 August – Once Upon a Time (1973)
15 August 
 Man About the House (1973–1976) 
 Reg Varney (1973–1974) 
17 August – Kung Fu (1972-1975)
1 September – Orson Welles' Great Mysteries (1973–1974)
4 September – Up the Workers (1973–1976)
21 September – Helen: A Woman of Today (1973)
29 September – New Faces (1973–1978, 1986–1988)
30 September – The Brontës of Haworth (1973)
3 October – Men of Affairs (1973)
26 October – Billy Liar (1973–1974)
29 October – Tell Tarby (1973)
30 October – Marked Personal (1973–1974)
31 October 
 The Tommy Cooper Hour (1973–1975)
 The World at War (1973–1974)
1 November – Beryl's Lot (1973–1977)
4 November – Oranges & Lemons (1973)
12 November 
 Potty Time (1973–1980)
 Roberts Robots (1973–1974)
19 November – The Streets of San Francisco (1972–1977)

Television shows

Returning this year after a break of one year or longer
 Sunday Night at the London Palladium (1955–1967, 1973–1974)

Continuing television shows

1920s
BBC Wimbledon (1927–1939, 1946–2019, 2021–present)

1930s
The Boat Race (1938–1939, 1946–2019)
BBC Cricket (1939, 1946–1999, 2020–2024)

1940s
Come Dancing (1949–1998)

1950s
Watch with Mother (1952–1975) 
The Good Old Days (1953–1983)
Panorama (1953–present)
Dixon of Dock Green (1955–1976)
Crackerjack (1955–1984, 2020–present)
Opportunity Knocks (1956–1978, 1987–1990)
This Week (1956–1978, 1986–1992)
Armchair Theatre (1956–1974)
What the Papers Say (1956–2008)
The Sky at Night (1957–present)
Blue Peter (1958–present)
Grandstand (1958–2007)

1960s
Coronation Street (1960–present)
Songs of Praise (1961–present)
Steptoe and Son (1962–1965, 1970–1974)
Z-Cars (1962–1978)
Animal Magic (1962–1983)
Doctor Who (1963–1989, 1996, 2005–present)
World in Action (1963–1998)
Top of the Pops (1964–2006)
Match of the Day (1964–present)
Crossroads (1964–1988, 2001–2003)
Play School (1964–1988)
Mr. and Mrs. (1965–1999)
Call My Bluff (1965–2005)
World of Sport (1965–1985)
Jackanory (1965–1996, 2006)
Sportsnight (1965–1997)
It's a Knockout (1966–1982, 1999–2001)
The Money Programme (1966–2010)
The Golden Shot (1967–1975)
Playhouse (1967–1982)
Dad's Army (1968–1977)
Magpie (1968–1980)
The Big Match (1968–2002)
Clangers (1969–1974, 2015–present)
Monty Python's Flying Circus (1969–1974)
Nationwide (1969–1983)
Screen Test (1969–1984)

1970s
The Goodies (1970–1982)
Upstairs, Downstairs (1971–1975, 2010–2012)
The Onedin Line (1971–1980)
The Old Grey Whistle Test (1971–1987)
The Two Ronnies (1971–1987, 1991, 1996, 2005)
Colditz (1972–1974)
The Protectors (1972–1974)
Love Thy Neighbour (1972–1976)
Thunderbirds (1972–1980, 1984–1987)
Clapperboard (1972–1982)
Crown Court (1972–1984)
Pebble Mill at One (1972–1986)
Are You Being Served? (1972–1985) 
Rainbow (1972–1992)
Emmerdale (1972–present)
Newsround (1972–present)
Weekend World (1972–1988)

Ending this year
 Father, Dear Father (1968–1973)
 Freewheelers (1968–1973)
 Nearest and Dearest (1968–1973)
 The Flaxton Boys (1969–1973)
 On the Buses (1969–1973)
 Crime of Passion (1970–1973)
 ...And Mother Makes Three (1971–1973)
 The Fenn Street Gang (1971–1973)
 Now Look Here (1971–1973)
 Follyfoot (1971–1973)
 Arthur of the Britons (1972–1973)
 Thirty Minutes Worth (1972–1973)
 War and Peace (1972–1973)
 Woodstock (1973)

Births
 18 January – Ben Willbond, comedy actor-writer
 29 January – Miranda Krestovnikoff, scientific presenter
 7 February – Kate Thornton, journalist and presenter
 8 February – Sonia Deol, presenter
 3 March – Alison King, actress
 5 April – Jason Done, actor
 24 April – Gabby Logan, media presenter
 30 April – Leigh Francis, comedian
 8 May – Marcus Brigstocke, English comedian, actor and screenwriter
 19 May – Alice Roberts, biological anthropologist and scientific presenter
 21 May – Noel Fielding, comedian and actor
 24 May – Dermot O'Leary, TV and radio presenter
 26 May – Julie Wilson Nimmo, Scottish actress
 2 June – Ortis Deley, television presenter
 9 June – Iain Lee, comedian and media presenter
 16 June – Amanda Byram, Irish-born presenter
 3 July – Emma Cunniffe, actress
 October – Alex Mahon, television executive
 11 October – Mark Chapman, broadcaster and newsreader
 21 October – Beverley Turner, media presenter
 5 November – Danniella Westbrook, actress and television presenter
 8 December – Kim Medcalf, actress

Deaths
 31 March – George Woodbridge, 66, Inigo Pipkin in Pipkins
 6 August – James Beck, 44, Private Walker in Dad's Army

See also
 1973 in British music
 1973 in British radio
 1973 in the United Kingdom
 List of British films of 1973

References